Frank Walter Raffety OBE (1875 – 8 September 1946) was a British barrister and Liberal Party politician.

He was the son of Charles Walter Raffety, of High Wycombe, Buckinghamshire and attended the Royal Grammar School, High Wycombe. In 1898 he was called to the bar at the Middle Temple, and practised on the Northern Circuit.

He developed an interest in politics, and became honorary secretary of the Social and Political Education League. The organisation was established to provide political education to the general public, and in particular to promote moderation over revolution. He was also an active member of the Eighty Club, an educational group within the Liberal Party.

He was selected as Liberal prospective parliamentary candidate for Stamford for a general election expected to take place in 1915.

He unsuccessfully contested the Lewisham West by-election in September 1921;

In March of the following year he was elected to the London County Council, as a (Liberal-backed) Progressive Party councillor for Islington West; 

At the general election in November 1922 he failed to win Bristol West;

A further general election was held in 1923, and Raffety was elected Liberal Member of Parliament (MP) for Bath;

His membership of the Commons was brief, as he was defeated when a further general election was called in 1924;

He again stood as a Liberal candidate at Cheltenham in 1929;

and East Dorset in 1935, but failed to be elected;

Raffety remained active in Liberal party politics, as a speaker. He became the Chairman of the Industrial Co-Partnership Association. In 1943 he was granted the freedom of the borough of High Wycombe, of which he had been honorary recorder since 1905. In 1945 he was made an Officer of the Order of British Empire.

He died at his home in Bramley, Surrey in August 1946, aged 71.

References

External links 
 

Members of London County Council
Members of the Middle Temple
1875 births
1946 deaths
Liberal Party (UK) MPs for English constituencies
Officers of the Order of the British Empire
People educated at the Royal Grammar School, High Wycombe
UK MPs 1923–1924
Politics of Bath, Somerset
Progressive Party (London) politicians